Hubert Rostaing (17 September 1918 – 10 June 1990) was a jazz clarinetist and tenor saxophonist. He also did film composition and classical music.

He began his career in Algiers with the "Red Hotters" and later moved to Paris. He might be best known for playing clarinet or saxophone in Django Reinhardt's quintet. His most known performance in that role might be his playing clarinet on Nuages. He later led a band, but after 1962 left jazz for film composing and classical music. He was orchestrator, conductor, or arranger for over 20 French films.

See also 
 Candide ou l'optimisme au XXe siècle (1960)

External links

1918 births
1990 deaths
Swing clarinetists
Swing saxophonists
French film score composers
French male film score composers
French jazz clarinetists
French jazz saxophonists
Male saxophonists
20th-century French composers
20th-century saxophonists
20th-century French male musicians
French male jazz musicians